Where Men Win Glory: The Odyssey of Pat Tillman, a 2009 book written by Jon Krakauer, is a biography of Pat Tillman, an American football player who left his professional career and enlisted in the United States Army after the September 11 attacks. He subsequently was killed in 2004 in the US war in Afghanistan by friendly fire, an incident which the US government attempted to cover up. To write the book, Krakauer drew heavily upon Tillman's journals, interviews with the Tillman family, Boots On the Ground by Dusk: My Tribute to Pat Tillman by Mary Tillman, and extensive research on the ground in Afghanistan.

Criticisms
While at a Sundance screening of the documentary film The Tillman Story (2010), Tillman's youngest brother Richard was asked about Krakauer's book.  His response was "that guy's a piece of ..."

References

External links

After Words interview with Krakauer on Where Men Win Glory, September 19, 2009

2009 non-fiction books
Political books
American biographies
War on Terror books
Alfred A. Knopf books
War in Afghanistan (2001–2021) books
Non-fiction books about the United States Army